Shinjuku Boys is a 1995 film by Kim Longinotto and Jano Williams. It explores the lives of three transgender men who work at the New Marilyn Club in Tokyo, Japan.

Reception
In 1995, Shinjuku Boys won Outstanding Documentary at the San Francisco Gay and Lesbian Film Festival, a Silver Hugo Prize at the Chicago International Film Festival and Gold Prize at Houston Film Festival. The film received positive reviews following its 2010 release by Second Run DVD. In a review at DVDTalk, Chris Neilson praised the films directors, commenting that "Through low-key cinéma vérité filmmaking, Longinotto and Williams provide insight into the professional and personal lives of the trio of onnabe [sic]". Sarah Cronin of Electric Sheep Magazine also notes that "Despite the fact that it's a cruder, more dated film, it's the strength of the interviews in Shinjuku Boys that makes it an even more arresting documentary."

See also
Shinjuku Ni-chōme, an LGBT bar district in Tokyo

References

External links 
 
 Shinjuku Boys at Women Make Movies

1995 films
Transgender-related documentary films
LGBT culture in Tokyo
1995 LGBT-related films
Films directed by Kim Longinotto
1995 documentary films
Transgender in Asia
British documentary films
Documentary films about Japan
Films shot in Tokyo
Trans men's culture
Films about trans men
Japan in non-Japanese culture
1990s British films